Clara M. Thompson (b. 1830s?) was an American novelist. She also wrote under the name Clara M. Thompson Logan.

Thompson wrote popular Victorian novels that were sentimental and moralistic in style, often peopled by religious characters.  The New York Times noted the publication of The Chapel of St. Mary in December 1860, writing that the book was "a readable one."

Works
 The Rectory of Moreland: or, My Duty (1859) (first published as Mary Evans)
 The Chapel of St. Mary (1861)
 Hawthorndean, or, Philip Benton's Family: A Story of Every Day Life (1873)

References

External links
 The Chapel of St. Mary on the Internet Archive
 The Rectory of Moreland on the Internet Archive

19th-century American novelists
19th-century American women writers